Longmanhill is a settlement in the Aberdeenshire parish of Gamrie; it is located along the A98 road connecting Fraserburgh to Macduff. This hamlet was founded in the year 1822 by the Earl of Fife. Nearby is a prehistoric cairn, the eponymous Longman Hill.

See also
 Burn of Myrehouse

References
 Gazetteer for Scotland: Longmanhill (2008) 
 C.Michael Hogan (2008) Longman Hill, Modern Antiquarian

Linenotes

Villages in Aberdeenshire